Muhammad Sani Yahaya (born 25 January 1952) is a Nigerian professor . Taraba State University lecturer and politician . He is a member of the New Nigeria People Party and the 2023 Taraba State gubernatorial election candidate to be elected on 18 March, 2023.

Political career
Professor Sani Yahaya has emerged as the gubernatorial candidate of the New Nigeria Peoples Party (NNPP) for Taraba State. 

Recall that the former university don recently withdrew his membership from the All Progressives Congress (APC) to join the NNPP.

He gave “lack of internal democracy” and the alleged failure of the APC to provide a level playing ground for all the governorship aspirants as a major reason for ditching the party.

In the primary elections that took place in Jalingo on Wednesday, Yahaya scored 464 votes to beat Philip Johnson and Al Amin Sale who scored 19 and 8 votes respectively.

Announcing the results, the Chairman of the electoral committee, Nura Hamisu Mohammed, said 501 votes were cast with 10 invalid votes.

In his acceptance speech, Yahaya confirmed that everybody participated in the elections and were satisfied with the results.

Flanked by his co-contestants, he said if all elections in the country could be like that of the NNPP, there would not be any form of rancour.

He urged Tarabans, irrespective of political party affiliations, to “join us in this journey which will bring dividends of democracy.”

Describing his newfound party as a party that would give “justice and fairness, and not the journey that would lead to a winner takes all”, he urged residents to work to ensure his victory. 

The gubernatorial candidate of the  New Nigeria  Peoples  Party, (NNPP)  in Taraba state, Professor  Muhammad  Sani  Yahaya has promised that he will provide scholarships to students in tertiary institutions to enable more young men and women to obtain high qualifications. 

He said more attention will be given to the teaching of science and technical subjects in secondary schools to have more students in the state qualify for admission to study science-related courses in Nigerian and foreign Universities. 

The candidate in his campaign tour across local government areas of the state told supporters of the New Nigeria peoples Party that his administration if elected governor of the state will focus more attention on lifting the standard of education at all levels.

Professor Sani Yahaya, a former Vice Chancellor of Taraba State University,  stated that his scholarship programme will benefit all students in tertiary institutions without discrimination.

He said as an educationist, he will ensure that students are encouraged to study professional courses like engineering, Medicine, and marketable computer science. 

According to him the only way to attain advancement for the state and the country at large is through education especially science and technology. 

He also pledged to tackle insecurity in the and also promised to address unemployment among the youths in the state, adding that engaging the youth through employment and empowerment will reduce restiveness among the youths.

Professor Sani Yahaya also pledged to ensure fairness in the distribution of state resources through development projects in all parts of the state.

Defeats 
The Supreme Court today upheld the victory of Governor Darius Dickson Ishaku in the March 9th 2019 governorship election in Taraba State.

The lead Judgement was read by Justice Ejembi Eko who held that the All Progressive Congress (APC) Taraba State has no locus standi first of all because they went into the 2019 General Elections without a candidate among other electoral requirements.

Justice Eko held that a candidate who did not participate in an election can not be allocated with votes and can not also be declared a winner.

He further declared that all votes cast for APC during the 2019 elections was void, invalid and wasted votes.

The court finally declared Governor Darius Dickson Ishaku as the winner of the March 9th 2019 Governorship elections with the highest number of lawful votes in compliance with the provisions of the electoral act .

Award 

- Former Deputy Vice Chancellor, Administration, Federal University of Technology, Yola (FUTY), Adamawa State.

- Former Dean, School of Agriculture and Agricultural Technology, FUTY.

- Former Head, Department of Animal Science and Range Management, FUTY.

- Former Member Academic Boards and Universities Councils.

- Former Chair, and Member of various committees within and outside the University

- Former President Committee for Improvement of Obihiro City, Japan

- Former President, International Students Obihiro University of Agriculture and Veterinary medicine, Japan.

- 2019 Governorship Candidate APC

- Former Chair, Governing Board, Federal Polytechnic, Bidda, Niger State.

- Chairman Buhari Campaign Origination, North-East 2017-2019 Patron Buhari Support Organization Taraba State 2017-2019

- Chairman Arewa Consultative Forum ACF Taraba Chapter.

References

